The 2003 Coca-Cola 600, the 44th running of the race, was a NASCAR Winston Cup Series race held on May 25, 2003, at Lowe's Motor Speedway in Charlotte, North Carolina. The race was the twelfth of the 2003 NASCAR Winston Cup Series season. The race was scheduled for 400 laps but was shortened to 276 laps because of rain. Jimmie Johnson of Hendrick Motorsports won the race, his first win of the season, and also at Charlotte. Matt Kenseth finished second and Bobby Labonte finished third.

Failed to qualify: Hermie Sadler ( 02), Brett Bodine (No. 11), Derrike Cope (No. 37)

On the day of the race, 0.55 inches of precipitation were recorded around the speedway.

Background

Lowe's Motor Speedway is a motorsports complex located in Concord, North Carolina, United States 13 miles from Charlotte, North Carolina. The complex features 1.5 miles (2.4 km) quad oval track that hosts NASCAR racing including the prestigious Coca-Cola 600 on Memorial Day weekend and The Winston, as well as the UAW-GM Quality 500. The speedway was built in 1959 by Bruton Smith and is considered the home track for NASCAR with many race teams located in the Charlotte area. The track is owned and operated by Speedway Motorsports Inc. (SMI) with Marcus G. Smith (son of Bruton Smith) as track president.

Top 10 results

Race statistics
 Time of race: 3:16:50
 Average Speed: 
 Pole Speed: 185.312
 Cautions: 8 for 46 laps
 Margin of Victory: under caution
 Lead changes: 16
 Percent of race run under caution: 16.7%         
 Average green flag run: 39.9 laps

References

Coca-Cola 600
Coca-Cola 600
NASCAR races at Charlotte Motor Speedway
Coca-Cola 600